Vasile Cosarek (born 9 November 1951) is a Romanian former footballer who played as a central midfielder. After he ended his playing career, he worked as a manager at teams from the Romanian lower leagues.

Honours

Player
Petrolul Ploiești
Divizia B: 1976–77

References

1951 births
Living people
Romanian footballers
Association football midfielders
Liga I players
Liga II players
FC Petrolul Ploiești players
FC Universitatea Cluj players
FCM Câmpina players
CSO Plopeni players
Romanian football managers
FC Petrolul Ploiești managers
FC Astra Giurgiu managers
Sportspeople from Ploiești